Lamont Amos "Monte" McFarland (November 7, 1872 – November 15, 1913) was a pitcher in Major League Baseball who played for the Chicago Colts in 1895 and 1896. He remained active as a player in the minor leagues through 1910.

His brother, Chappie McFarland, was also a professional baseball player.

External links
Baseball Reference

Chicago Colts players
Major League Baseball pitchers
Baseball players from Illinois
1872 births
1913 deaths
19th-century baseball players
Fort Worth Panthers players
Grand Rapids Rippers players
Grand Rapids Gold Bugs players
Cedar Rapids Rabbits players
Youngstown Little Giants players
New Castle Quakers players
Marion Glass Blowers players
Nashville Vols players
Shreveport Giants players
Decatur Commodores players
Memphis Egyptians players
New Orleans Pelicans (baseball) players
Dubuque Dubs players
Clinton Infants players
Clinton Champs players
People from White Hall, Illinois